Jan Just (born 14 September 1996) is a German professional footballer who plays as a defender for VfR Aalen.

References

1996 births
Living people
German footballers
Sportspeople from Mainz
Footballers from Rhineland-Palatinate
Association football defenders
Wormatia Worms players
TSV Schott Mainz players
SV Waldhof Mannheim players
VfR Aalen players
3. Liga players
Regionalliga players
Oberliga (football) players